Robert W. Hazlett House is a historic home located at Wheeling, Ohio County, West Virginia. It features a central hooded bay and a polychrome slate-covered mansard roof. The interior has many Queen Anne style details. In 1991, it housed Friends of Wheeling, Inc., a private, non-profit, historic preservation organization and four apartments.

It was listed on the National Register of Historic Places in 1991.

References

Houses in Wheeling, West Virginia
Houses on the National Register of Historic Places in West Virginia
Second Empire architecture in West Virginia
Queen Anne architecture in West Virginia
Houses completed in 1887
National Register of Historic Places in Wheeling, West Virginia